Lance Allen Carson (December 3, 1945 – October 14, 2020) was an American politician. He was a Republican member of the South Dakota House of Representatives representing District 20 from 2007 to 2015 and 2017 to 2019.

Biography
Carson was born in Nunda, South Dakota. He graduated from Rutland High School and Southern State Teachers College. He served in the United States Army during the Vietnam War. Carson owned a gas station and automobile repair shop in Brookings, South Dakota.

Carson and his wife moved to Mitchell, South Dakota, and operated Lance's Interstate Amoco for twenty-five years. After serving in the legislature Carson was elected to serve as the County Chair for the Davison County Republican Party. Prior to Carson's death he endorsed Barry Volk as his successor as State House Representative from District 20.

Health and death
Carson had suffered from heart problems after having four heart attacks, including the first one at age 38. He wore a heart pump in his later years and undergone two bypass surgeries. Carson was hospitalized for a blood infection in 2012 which developed into leukemia. He died from COVID-19 in Minneapolis on October 14, 2020, at age 74, during the COVID-19 pandemic in Minnesota.

Elections
2012 Carson and incumbent Representative Tona Rozum were unopposed for the June 5, 2012 Republican Primary; and won the four-way November 6, 2012 General election where Carson took the first seat with 5,841 votes (32%) and Representative Rozum took the second seat against Democratic nominees James Schorzmann and Dave Mitchell, who had run for the seat in 2006 and 2008.
2006 When incumbent Republican Representative Lou Sebert was term limited and left the Legislature and left a District 20 seat open, Carson and incumbent Representative Mike Vehle were unopposed for the June 6, 2006 Republican Primary, and won the four-way November 7, 2006 General election, where Carson took the first seat with 4,530 votes (29.4%) and Representative Vehle took the second seat ahead of Democratic nominees Susan Steele and David Mitchell.
2008 With incumbent Republican Representative Vehle running for South Dakota Senate and leaving a District 20 seat open, Carson and Noel Hamiel were unopposed for the June 3, 2008 Republican Primary; in the four-way November 4, 2008 General election, Carson took the first seat with 5,599 votes (33.1%) and Hamiel took the second seat ahead of Democratic nominees Tony Sieler and returning 2006 opponent David Mitchell.
2010 With incumbent Republican Representative Hamiel leaving the Legislature leaving a District 20 seat open, Carson and Tona Rozum were unopposed for the June 8, 2010 Republican Primary; in the three-way November 2, 2010 General election Carson took the first seat with 5,363 votes (43.4%) and Rozum took the second seat ahead of Independent Becky Haslam.

References

External links
Official page at the South Dakota Legislature
 

1945 births
2020 deaths
Republican Party members of the South Dakota House of Representatives
People from Lake County, South Dakota
People from Mitchell, South Dakota
Military personnel from South Dakota
University of South Dakota alumni
Businesspeople from South Dakota
Deaths from the COVID-19 pandemic in Minnesota